Route 331 is a collector road in the Canadian province of Nova Scotia.

It is located on the province's South Shore, connecting Mill Village at Highway 103 with Bridgewater at Route 325.

Communities
Mill Village
East Port Medway
Vogler's Cove 
Cherry Hill 
Broad Cove 
Petite Rivière 
Crescent Beach 
West Dublin 
Dublin Shore 
LaHave 
Pentz 
West LaHave 
Pleasantville 
Conquerall Bank 
Bridgewater

Parks
Rissers Beach Provincial Park

History

The entirety of Collector Highway 331 was once designated as Trunk Highway 31.

See also
List of Nova Scotia provincial highways

References

331
331
331
Bridgewater, Nova Scotia